The 2022 United States Senate election in Connecticut was held on November 8, 2022, to elect a member of the United States Senate to represent the State of Connecticut.

Democrat Richard Blumenthal was first elected to this seat in 2010 with 55.2% of the vote over Republican Linda McMahon. He was then re-elected in 2016 with 63.2% of the vote over Republican Dan Carter. Blumenthal ran for reelection to a third term in office and secured the 2022 nomination. Businesswoman Leora Levy won the Republican primary on August 9, 2022. Blumenthal won reelection, defeating Levy by about 15 points. The race simultaneously took place with the 2022 Connecticut gubernatorial election.

Democratic convention

Candidates

Nominated at convention 
Richard Blumenthal, incumbent U.S. Senator

Endorsements

Republican primary

Candidates

Nominee
Leora Levy, businesswoman, Republican National Committee member, and former nominee for U.S. Ambassador to Chile

Eliminated in primary
Themis Klarides, former Minority Leader of the Connecticut House of Representatives
Peter Lumaj, attorney and perennial candidate

Eliminated at convention
Nicholas Connors
John Flynn, candidate for the Connecticut House of Representatives in 2018 and 2020
Robert F. Hyde, lobbyist and U.S. Marine Corps veteran

Declined
Dan Carter, former state representative and nominee for U.S. Senate in 2016
 Bob Stefanowski, businessman and nominee for governor in 2018 (ran for governor)

Endorsements

Results

General election

Predictions

Endorsements

Polling
Aggregate polls

Graphical summary
 

Richard Blumenthal vs. Themis Klarides

Richard Blumenthal vs. Peter Lumaj

Richard Blumenthal vs. generic opponent

Generic Democrat vs. generic Republican

Debates

Results

See also 
 2022 United States Senate elections
 List of United States senators from Connecticut

Notes 

Partisan clients

References

External links 
Official campaign websites
 Richard Blumenthal (D) for Senate
 Leora Levy (R) for Senate

2022
Connecticut
United States Senate